Stephen Stat Smith (born May 25, 1955) is an American politician who represented the 28th Middlesex District in the Massachusetts House of Representatives.

Early life
Smith was born on May 25, 1955 in Chelsea, Massachusetts. His parents divorced when he was young and he lived with his mother in Everett, Massachusetts' Woodlawn housing projects. He attended Everett public schools and Bunker Hill Community College.

Political career
Smith was a member of the Everett Board of Aldermen from 1994 to 1995. He was an unsuccessful candidate for Mayor in 1995, Alderman At-Large in 1997, and Ward 3 Alderman in 1999. From 2001 to 2002 he was a member of the Everett Youth Commission. From 2002 to 2003 he was a member of the Everett Common Council. In 2004 he ran for state representative, but lost to incumbent Edward G. Connolly in the Democratic primary. From 2006 to 2007 he served on the Board of Aldermen.

In 2006 he was elected state representative. On December 20, 2012, US Attorney Carmen Ortiz announced that Smith had agreed to plead guilty to two misdemeanor counts of deprivation of rights under color of law for his role in a voter fraud scheme in which Smith cast absentee ballots for voters who were ineligible or unaware of ballots being cast in their names. It was announced that Smith would resign effective January 1, 2013. As part of his plea agreement, Smith will not be allowed to run for public office for five years.

References

1955 births
Massachusetts politicians convicted of crimes
Bunker Hill Community College alumni
Democratic Party members of the Massachusetts House of Representatives
Politicians from Everett, Massachusetts
Politicians from Chelsea, Massachusetts
Living people
American politicians convicted of fraud